Papyrus 76 (in the Gregory-Aland numbering), signed by 𝔓76, is a copy of the New Testament in Greek. It is a papyrus manuscript of the Gospel of John. The surviving texts of John are verses 4:9,12.

The manuscript paleographically has been assigned to the 6th century.

The Greek text of this codex is mixed. Aland placed it in Category III.

It is currently housed at the Österreichische Nationalbibliothek (Pap. Vindob. G. 36102) in Vienna.

See also 

 List of New Testament papyri

References

Further reading 

 Herbert Hunger, Zwei unbekannte neutestamentliche Papyrusfragmente der österreichischen Nationalbibliothek, Biblos VIII (Vienna: 1959), pp. 7–12.

New Testament papyri
6th-century biblical manuscripts
Biblical manuscripts of the Austrian National Library
Gospel of John papyri